The 2019 GEICO 500 was a Monster Energy NASCAR Cup Series race held on April 28, 2019, at Talladega Superspeedway in Lincoln, Alabama. Contested over 188 laps on the 2.66 mile (4.28 km) superspeedway, it was the 10th race of the 2019 Monster Energy NASCAR Cup Series season.

Report

Background

Talladega Superspeedway, formerly known as Alabama International Motor Speedway, is a motorsports complex located north of Talladega, Alabama. It is located on the former Anniston Air Force Base in the small city of Lincoln. A tri-oval, the track was constructed in 1969 by the International Speedway Corporation, a business controlled by the France family. Talladega is most known for its steep banking. The track currently hosts NASCAR's Monster Energy NASCAR Cup Series, Xfinity Series and Gander Outdoors Truck Series. Talladega is the longest NASCAR oval with a length of 2.66-mile-long (4.28 km) tri-oval like the Daytona International Speedway, which is a 2.5-mile-long (4.0 km).

Entry list

Practice

First practice

Final practice

Qualifying

Qualifying results

Tyler Reddick practiced and qualified the No. 62 for Brendan Gaughan, who was attending his son’s first communion.
Eight cars failed post-qualifying inspection and would be forced to drop to the rear at the start (Nos. 6, 11, 17, 18, 19, 20, 27, 51)

Race

Stage Results

Stage One
Laps: 55

Stage Two
Laps: 55

Final Stage Results

Stage Three
Laps: 78

Race statistics
 Lead changes: 37 among 15 different drivers
 Cautions/Laps: 6 for 21
 Red flags: 1 for 8 minutes and 47 seconds
 Time of race: 3 hours, 5 minutes and 59 seconds
 Average speed:

Media

Television
Fox Sports covered their 19th race at the Talladega Superspeedway. Mike Joy, six-time Talladega winner – and all-time restrictor plate race wins record holder – Jeff Gordon and four-time Talladega winner Darrell Waltrip called the race in the booth for the race. Jamie Little, Vince Welch and Matt Yocum handled the action on pit road for the television side.

Radio
MRN had the radio call for the race which was also simulcast on Sirius XM NASCAR Radio. Alex Hayden, Jeff Striegle and two-time Talladega winner Dale Jarrett called the race in the booth when the field raced through the tri-oval. Dave Moody called the race from the Sunoco spotters stand outside turn 2 when the field raced through turns 1 and 2. Mike Bagley called the race from a platform inside the backstretch when the field raced down the backstretch. Kurt Becker called the race from the Sunoco spotters stand outside turn 4 when the field raced through turns 3 and 4. Winston Kelley, Kim Coon, Steve Post, and Dillon Welch worked pit road for the radio side.

Standings after the race

Drivers' Championship standings

Manufacturers' Championship standings

Note: Only the first 16 positions are included for the driver standings.
. – Driver has clinched a position in the Monster Energy NASCAR Cup Series playoffs.

References

GEICO 500
GEICO 500
GEICO 500
NASCAR races at Talladega Superspeedway